Sungard Availability Services (Sungard AS) is a provider of IT production and recovery services with annual revenues of approximately $773 million and offices in 12 countries.   The company uses its experience in recovery to design, build and run production environments that are resilient and available.

With 1,500 IT and business professionals, the company manages 20 mobile facilities staged in strategic locations and 75 hardened data centers and workplace recovery facilities connected by a redundant, global dedicated network backbone.

History 
SunGard Data Systems (SDS) is formed in 1983 through the leveraged buyout of a division of Sun Oil Company.  In 1986, the SunGard Data Systems went public through an IPO and was listed on the NASDAQ as SNDT.  In 1997 their listing shifted to the NYSE as SDS.

In 2001, SunGard acquired Comdisco’s business continuity services extending the company’s reach to Europe.  Additional acquisitions of Guardian IT (2002) and Inflow (2005), further extended the company’s reach.

In 2005, SDS was purchased in a transaction valued at $11.3 billion, by a team led by SilverLake.  Additional SDS acquisitions followed, including their 2007 purchase of Vericenter  to provide managed hosting and production availability and a 2010 acquisition of 365 Hosting Limited, an Ireland-based hosted infrastructure provider of Managed Services and Cloud offerings.

On April 1, 2014, Sungard Availability Services split off from SunGard Data Systems, to become an independent company.

In April 2019, Sungard AS announced it would file for Chapter 11 bankruptcy protection "as part of a consensual agreement with a majority of its creditors to reduce its nearly $1.3 billion debt by more than two-thirds."

On May 3, 2019, Sungard AS successfully completed its financial restructuring and emerged from its "prepackaged" Chapter 11.

On April 11, 2022, Sungard AS again filed for voluntary Chapter 11 reorganization, citing as reasons rising energy costs and the COVID-19 pandemic having caused organizations to shift to remote work.

Services
Sungard Availability Services offers IT production and recovery services that include IT infrastructure, Cloud computing, Disaster Recovery, and Workplace Recovery. Infrastructure services include traditional colocation which was enhanced with Megaport cloud connectivity in August and September 2020. Cloud services include public and private cloud services that leverage technologies from Dell Technologies, VMware, and Amazon Web Services.

Awards 
In April 2019, Sungard Availability Services received the highest score for both the Strategy and Current offering categories among the eight vendors included in The Forrester Wave: Disaster-Recovery-As-A-Service Providers, Q2 2019.

In June 2020, Sungard Availability Services was listed as a Contender in The Forrester Wave: Hosted Private Cloud Services In North America, Q2 2020 and The Forrester Wave: Hosted Private Cloud Services In Europe, Q2 2020.

References 

Companies based in Delaware County, Pennsylvania
Privately held companies based in Pennsylvania
Information technology companies of the United States
American companies established in 1978
1978 establishments in Pennsylvania
Technology companies established in 1978
Companies that filed for Chapter 11 bankruptcy in 2019
Companies that filed for Chapter 11 bankruptcy in 2022
Kohlberg Kravis Roberts companies
Corporate spin-offs